The Karata or Khkhiridi people are a small ethnic group from Dagestan, North Caucasia. The Karata mainly reside in the Akhvakh and Khazavyurt district. They primarily speak the Karata language.

History 
The Karatas and Avars share a close history. By the 18th century, the Karatas formed an autonomous "free community". There was frequent conflicts between the Karata and neighbouring peoples over control of grazing lands and pastures. In the early 19th century, the region was conquered by the Russians although an administrative structure did not emerge until the 1870s.

Culture 
The Karatas have historically engaged in raising livestock, farming, and bartering. Common animals raised were sheep, horses and cattle. Terraced farming was done due to adverse natural conditions and lack of cultivable land. Rye, flax, wheat, potatoes, and vegetables are staple crops grown.

The Karatas are Sunni Muslims. Islam first arrived in the region as early as the 8th century but the locals only adopted the religion by the 16th century.

References

Ethnic groups in Dagestan
Muslim communities of Russia
Peoples of the Caucasus
Muslim communities of the Caucasus